The Clean Boating Act of 2008 (CBA) is a United States law that requires recreational vessels to implement best management practices to control pollution discharges. The law exempts these vessels from requirements to obtain a discharge permit under the Clean Water Act (i.e. they are exempt from coverage under the EPA Vessels General Permit).

The CBA amended the Clean Water Act (CWA) and directs the U.S. Environmental Protection Agency (EPA) to develop performance standard regulations. The regulations will not apply to sewage discharges from recreational vessels, which are already regulated under the CWA. (See Marine sanitation device.) The CBA designated the U.S. Coast Guard as the enforcing agency.

In 2011 EPA conducted public meetings to obtain public comment about developing CBA regulations. As of 2020, EPA has not announced a schedule for issuing the regulations.

See also
 Regulation of ship pollution in the United States

References

Acts of the 110th United States Congress
Environmental impact of shipping
Maritime history of the United States
Ocean pollution
Pollution in the United States
Water pollution in the United States
United States admiralty law
United States federal environmental legislation